The 1917 Southern Intercollegiate Athletic Association football season  was the college football games played by the member schools of the Southern Intercollegiate Athletic Association as part of the 1917 college football season. The season began on September 28. A curtailing of expenses was required for extension into 1918.

John Heisman's Georgia Tech team won the conference and was the South's first consensus national champion. Tech captain Walker Carpenter and halfback Everett Strupper were the first players from the Deep South ever selected for an All-America first-team. Tech quarterback Albert Hill led the nation in scoring. Though Centre did not claim a championship, it also posted an undefeated conference record, beginning the rise of its football program.

Regular season

SIAA teams in bold.

Week One

Week Two

Week Three

Week Four

Week Five

Week Six

Week Seven

Week Eight

Week Nine

Week Ten

Awards and honors

All-Americans

T – Walker Carpenter, Georgia Tech (MS, DJ)
C – Pup Phillips, Georgia Tech (DJ)
QB – Albert Hill, Georgia Tech (JV-2)
HB – Everett Strupper, Georgia Tech (MS; JV-2; PP-1 [qb], DJ [qb])
HB – Joe Guyon, Georgia Tech (PP-2, DJ)

All-Southern team

The composite All-Southern eleven formed by the selection of 7 coaches and sporting writers included:

References